In scaled reptiles, supraocular scales are (enlarged) scales on the crown immediately above the eye. The size and shape of these scales are among the many characteristics used to differentiate species from each another.

In many species of boids and viperids, the supraoculars are heavily fragmented. In others, such as the colubrids and elapids, they are enlarged.

See also

 Ocular scales
 Snake scales
 Anatomical terms of location

References

Snake scales